The Cryosphere is a peer-reviewed scientific journal focusing on all aspects of frozen water and ground (especially glaciers) on Earth and on other planetary bodies. It was established in 2007 and is published by Copernicus Publications on behalf of the European Geosciences Union. The editors-in-chief are Chris Derksen (Environment and Climate Change Canada), Olaf Eisen (Alfred Wegener Institute for Polar and Marine Research), Christian Haas (Alfred Wegener Institute for Polar and Marine Research), Christian Hauck (University of Fribourg), Nanna Bjørnholt Karlsson (Geological Survey of Denmark and Greenland) and Thomas Mölg (University of Erlangen–Nuremberg). According to the Journal Citation Reports, the journal has a 2020 impact factor of 5.771.

References

External links 
 

Copernicus Publications academic journals
C
Publications established in 2007
Open access journals
Glaciology journals
English-language journals